Tomasz Michał Makowski (born 19 July 1999) is a Polish professional footballer who plays as a midfielder for Zagłębie Lubin.

Honours
Lechia Gdańsk
Polish Cup: 2018–19
Polish Super Cup: 2019

References

External links

1999 births
Living people
Polish footballers
Poland youth international footballers
Poland under-21 international footballers
Association football midfielders
Lechia Gdańsk players
Lechia Gdańsk II players
Górnik Łęczna players
Zagłębie Lubin players
Ekstraklasa players
I liga players
II liga players
III liga players
IV liga players